Constance Binney (June 28, 1896 – November 15, 1989) was an American stage and film actress and dancer.

Biography
Born in New York City, Binney was educated at Westover School, a private college preparatory boarding school for girls in Middlebury, Connecticut, and in Paris, France. Her father, Harold Osgood Binney and her mother, Gertrude Miles, were both from wealthy and socially connected families. A maternal uncle was Basil Miles of Philadelphia, American diplomat to Russia in the State Department during the presidency of Woodrow Wilson. In 1934, she told a newspaper reporter, "I was born a society wench, and I've resented it ever since."

She made her Broadway theatre debut in Saturday to Monday (1917) and the following year appeared with her actress sister, Faire Binney, in the Maurice Tourneur silent film, Sporting Life, her film debut. In 1919, she starred opposite John Barrymore in The Test of Honor. Her other Broadway credits included Oh, Lady! Lady! (1918), 39 East (1919), and Sweet Little Devil (1924).

Modern assessment of her career is limited as most of her films are now lost, with only two of her films surviving in a complete form, Erstwhile Susan and The Case of Becky, along with a single reel of First Love.

Binney married Charles Edward Cotting, Jr, a Boston banker, in Old Lyme, CT in 1926. They divorced in 1932. Two months later, she married Henry Wharton, Jr., at city hall in New York City. Wharton was a prominent Philadelphia attorney. That marriage also ended in divorce.

Binney last performed on Broadway in 1924. She appeared on stage in London and in 1941, during the Second World War, married the British Royal Air Force (RAF) pilot, Geoffrey Leonard Cheshire, later, Baron Cheshire, who was twenty years her junior. However, the marriage was childless, and the couple were estranged after the war ended, divorcing in 1951.

Death
Binney died in 1989 in Whitestone, Queens, New York City, aged 93.

Legacy
Binney has a star on the Hollywood Walk of Fame, located on the 6300 block of Hollywood Boulevard.

Filmography

References

External links

passport portrait of Constance Binney
portrait gallery (Univ. of Washington, Sayre)

American film actresses
American stage actresses
American silent film actresses
Actresses from New York City
1896 births
1989 deaths
20th-century American actresses
Spouses of life peers